Aphidini is a bug tribe in the subfamily Aphidinae.

Genera

Subtribe: Aphidina
Aleurosiphon - 
Andinaphis - 
Anthemidaphis - 
Aphis -
Brachyunguis -
Braggia -
Casimira -
Chomaphis -
Cryptosiphum -
Eastopiella -
Ephedraphis -
Misturaphis -
Nevadaphis -
Paradoxaphis -
Pehuenchaphis -
Protaphis -
Ryoichitakahashia -
Sanbornia -
Seneciobium -
Siphonatrophia -
Szelegiewicziella -
Toxopterina -
Xerobion -

Subtribe: Rhopalosiphina
Asiphonaphis -
Hallaphis -
Hyalopterus -
Hysteroneura -
Melanaphis -
Mordvilkoiella -
Pseudasiphonaphis -
Pseudotoxoptera -
Rhopalosiphum -
Schizaphis -
Swirskiaphis -

References

External links 

 
Hemiptera tribes
Taxa named by Pierre André Latreille